45 Broad Street is a 68-story,  supertall residential skyscraper being constructed in the Financial District of Manhattan, New York City. The building will become Lower Manhattan's tallest residential tower. Excavation started in 2017, but , construction is on hold.

History

Site 
Swig Equities acquired the 45 Broad Street site, as well as the adjacent Broad Exchange Building, in 2006. Swig planned to demolish a preexisting building at 45 Broad Street and part of the Broad Exchange Building to transfer air rights for a proposed development. Swig wished to build a Nobu Hotel for the site, which was backed by Robert De Niro. The building would have been designed by Moed de Armas and Shannon with a conventional glass curtain wall along with interiors by David Rockwell. The building would have contained a  retail base, 128 hotel rooms, and 77 "super-luxury" condominiums above the hotel on floors 41 through 62.

In January 2009, Swig defaulted on a $49.2 million mortgage from Lehman Brothers, leading to foreclosure on the property. In March 2012, Lehman took control of the property for $76.79 million.

In 2014, the parcel was placed on the market, and Madison Equities finalized their acquisition of the land in October of that year. AMS Acquisitions is also an investor in the project, and the building will be constructed by firm Pizzarotti-IBC.

Construction 
Real estate site 6sqft released early renderings of the new plans for the site in January 2016. After the release of the renderings, Pizzarotti-IBC Rance MacFarland confirmed that the new structure would be a supertall, residential skyscraper catering to "entry- and mid-level buyers". More developed renderings were published by The Real Deal in February 2016.

Members of the New York real estate industry have expressed doubts that Madison will recoup costs, and the company has faced difficulty receiving funding for the project. These difficulties are in part due to the site's proximity to the New York Stock Exchange Building and the high-level security around that structure.  However, the anticipated pricing of units in the building at just under $1 million up to $4 million has attracted additional investors including Gemdale (one of China's largest developers) given the softening super-luxury market. 

The building was approved for construction in December 2019. However, construction was placed on hold in January 2020

Architecture
The building is being designed by CetraRuddy, which also designed One Madison, and is being built by Pizzarotti LLC. The building's bronze aluminum cladding and its distinctive crown will make it one of the first so-called neo-Art Deco skyscrapers being built in New York City.

The building will be mixed-use with 245 residences and a five-story retail base with  dedicated to commercial-retail use and  dedicated to a school. Amenities in the building will include a fitness center with a pool, an outdoor garden, and several lounges.  Windbreak levels will puncture the facade on the 27th and 43rd floors. The two floors will have 32-foot tall ceilings made open for terrace space.

Subway elevators
In July 2016, it was announced that the New York City Landmarks Preservation Commission had approved the construction of two new subway elevators outside the entrance to the building, available for public use. They will connect to the existing Broad Street station of the New York City Subway's . The design of the elevators is being overseen by Urbahn Architects. The plans call for two elevators, one for each platform, at the northeastern and southwestern corners of Broad Street and Exchange Place. The New York City Council approved the construction of the elevators in July 2018, and granted the developers 71,391 additional square feet in zoning rights in exchange for building the elevators. However, residents and tenants of 15 and 30 Broad Street opposed construction of glass-and-metal elevators, citing they posed a risk for terrorist attacks.

References

Broad Street (Manhattan)
Financial District, Manhattan
Proposed skyscrapers in the United States
Residential skyscrapers in Manhattan